Quandt is a surname. In particular, it may refer to members of the notable Quandt family:
Günther Quandt (1881–1954), German industrialist, founded an industrial empire that includes BMW and Altana
Harald Quandt (1921–1967), German industrialist, stepson of Joseph Goebbels
Herbert Quandt (1910–1982), German industrialist, regarded as having saved BMW and made huge profit
Johanna Quandt (1926–2015), German widow of industrialist Herbert Quandt
Silvia Quandt (born 1937), German artist and one of Germany's richest women
Stefan Quandt (born 1966), German engineer and industrialist

Other notable people with the surname include:
Bernhard Quandt (1903–1999), German politician (SPD, KPD, SED)
Johann Gottlob von Quandt (1787–1859), German artist, art scholar and collector
Johann Jakob Quandt (1686–1772), German Lutheran theologian
Pablo Quandt (born 1985), Colombian footballer
Richard E. Quandt (born 1930), Guggenheim Fellowship winning economist
Theodor Quandt (1897–1940), German, World War I flying ace credited with 15 aerial victories
Thorsten Quandt (born 1971), German scholar, professor in the Department of Communication at the University of Münster
William B. Quandt (born 1941), American scholar, author, professor in the Department of Politics at the University of Virginia

See also
Goldfeld–Quandt test